Ponatahi is a community in the South Wairarapa District of New Zealand's North Island.  It is located near the Ruamahanga River south-southeast of Carterton and north east of Greytown.  Nearby smaller settlements include Longbush to the south and Gladstone to the east.

Ponatahi is lowly populated and situated in a hilly rural area.  The nearest state highway is State Highway 2 and the nearest railway is the Wairarapa Line, both in Carterton.  Although there is a Ponatahi Christian School, it is no longer in Ponatahi but is located in Carterton.

Populated places in the Wellington Region
South Wairarapa District